The 2021 Murray River Open was a tournament on the 2021 ATP Tour. It was played on outdoor hard courts in Melbourne, Australia. It was organised as a lead-up tournament to the 2021 Australian Open, and was held at the same venue, due to other tournaments in Australia being cancelled as a result from the COVID-19 pandemic. This tournament took place simultaneously with the 2021 Great Ocean Road Open and the 2021 ATP Cup.

Points and prize money

Point distribution

Prize money

*per team

Singles main-draw entrants

Seeds

1 Rankings are as of January 25, 2021

Other entrants
The following players received wildcards into the main draw:
  Andrew Harris
  Jason Kubler
  Blake Mott
  Li Tu

The following players have been accepted directly into the main draw using a protected or a special ranking:
  Thanasi Kokkinakis

The following player received entry as an alternate:
  Harry Bourchier

Withdrawals 
Before the tournament
  Alejandro Davidovich Fokina → replaced by  Yūichi Sugita
  João Sousa → replaced by  James Duckworth
  Bernard Tomic → replaced by  Harry Bourchier
During the tournament
  Stan Wawrinka

Retirements
  Jiří Veselý

Doubles main-draw entrants

Seeds

 Rankings are as of January 25, 2021.

Other entrants
The following pairs received wildcards into the doubles main draw:
  James Duckworth /  Marc Polmans
  Andrew Harris /  Alexei Popyrin

The following pair received entry using a protected ranking:
  Mackenzie McDonald /  Tommy Paul

Champions

Singles

  Dan Evans def.  Félix Auger-Aliassime, 6–2, 6–3

Doubles

  Nikola Mektić /  Mate Pavić def.  Jérémy Chardy /  Fabrice Martin, 7–6(7–2), 6–3

References

External links
Tournament overview on the ATP Tour official website

2021 ATP Tour
2021 in Australian tennis
Tennis tournaments in Australia
Tennis in Victoria (Australia)
Sport in Victoria (Australia)
February 2021 sports events in Australia